Running on Machinery is the fourth studio album and fifth overall release by American independent singer Megan Slankard, released on May 19, 2015.

Track listing
 "Bones Live Forever" (Slankard, Blau, Caprista) – 3:13
 "Diving In" (Slankard)  – 4:10
 "825" (Slankard, DePrato, Caprista)  – 3:12
 "Lost Together" (Slankard) – 3:37
 "If I Knew (feat. Jeff Campbell)" (Slankard) – 4:02
 "Like Always Alex" (Slankard) – 4:50
 "What It's Worth" (Slankard) – 4:07
 "Can't Keep it In" (Slankard, Caprista) – 4:05
 "Taking My Chances" (Slankard) – 2:30
 "What a Way to Fail" (Slankard) – 4:41
 "Next to You (A Nuclear Love Song)" (Slankard) – 4:19

Release and promotion
Running on Machinery was produced by Alex Wong, and recorded at Tiny Telephone Studios John Vanderslice in San Francisco, Angel House South Nashville, and mixed by Eddie Jackson. Slankard performed an album pre-release performance on October 18, 2014, and will play a follow up release show on October 16, 2015 San Francisco, CA.

Personnel
 Danny Blau – rhythm guitar, keyboard
 Kyle Capistra – drums, percussion, background vocals
 James Deprato – electric guitar
 Jeff Symonds – bass
 Alex Wong – producer

References

External links
 Live Music Video page for single "Bones Live Forever"

2015 albums
Megan Slankard albums